Hsin Shih-chang is a Taiwanese academic. He was the Deputy Minister of the Overseas Community Affairs Council of the Executive Yuan, having served since 18 August 2014 to 19 May, 2016.

Early life and education
Hsin obtained his bachelor's degree from the Department of Chinese Literature and Language of National Taiwan Normal University. He then continued his study to the United States at Indiana University-Bloomington and obtained his master's and doctoral degrees in Instructional Systems Technology.

Early career
In 1994-1995, he was the Associate Professor of the Department of Visual Communications at Shih Hsin University. He then moved to the Graduate Institute of Teaching Chinese as a Second Language of National Taiwan Normal University to become Associate Professor in 1995-2001, Full Professor in 2001 to present, and Chair in 2001-2007. In 2010-2011, he was the Deputy Dean of the International Affairs Division.

He was also the President of Association of Teaching Chinese as a Second Language. In 2004-2005, he was the Visiting Scholar of the Department of East Asian Languages and Civilizations of Harvard University in the United States and in 2008-2009 as a Visiting Professor of the Free University of Berlin in Germany.

Political career
Hsin had worked with the OCAC on the promotion of overseas Chinese education for over 20 years and thus invited to be the Deputy Minister for OCAC, in charge of educational and cultural affairs, in terms of overseas Chinese language education, overseas Chinese students recruitment strategies and overseas Chinese media collaborations.

References

Government ministers of Taiwan
Living people
Academic staff of Shih Hsin University
National Taiwan Normal University alumni
Academic staff of the National Tsing Hua University
Indiana University Bloomington alumni
Year of birth missing (living people)